Louis II (15 August 1824 – 22 January 1858) was Grand Duke of Baden from 24 April 1852 to his death in 1858. He was the son of Leopold I, Grand Duke of Baden, and Princess Sophie of Sweden.

Louis succeeded his father as Grand Duke of Baden on 24 April 1852. His brother Frederick acted as regent, because Louis had mental illness. However, in 1856, Frederick became grand duke as well. He was also an honorary citizen of Karlsruhe.

Ancestry

References

 

 
 
 

House of Zähringen
Protestant monarchs
Nobility from Karlsruhe
1824 births
1858 deaths
Grand Dukes of Baden
Hereditary Princes of Baden
Royalty and nobility with disabilities
Grand Crosses of the Order of Saint Stephen of Hungary
Royal reburials